Angelo Carusone (born May 16, 1982) is an American author and media advocate. He is the president of Media Matters for America, a nonprofit media watchdog. Carusone has also led political and progressive initiatives such as Dump Trump and StopBeck campaigns.

Early life and education
Carusone was born on May 16, 1982. He did not publicly disclose his biographical background until he revealed personal information through his writing published in 2015, where he stated that his father was Stephen Carusone. His birthplace and the identity of his mother are unknown. His father was a sewer and drain cleaner while his mother was a part-time lunch lady.

Carusone completed his BA diploma in American Studies at Fordham University in 2000. He finished a degree in Philosophy at the same university in 2004. In 2010, he obtained his Juris Doctor diploma from the University of Wisconsin Law School.

Career
Carusone gained attention in American politics for his initiatives that target right-wing personalities who he considers “bullies”. These activities, which he calls “brand safety”, include campaigns that helped drive advertisers away from the shows of Glenn Beck, who eventually lost his Fox News show, and Rush Limbaugh. He is also said to have played a role in hastening the departure of Bill O'Reilly from Fox.

In 2012, Carusone also initiated the Dump Trump campaign. This initiative called on retailers to discontinue selling Trump-branded products. Trump threatened him with a $25 million lawsuit.

In 2016, Carusone served as the Deputy CEO of the Finance and Administration of the Democratic National Convention. In December of the same year, he was promoted president of Media Matters, having previously served as its executive vice president. He succeeded the organization’s founder David Brock. When he assumed the position, he stated that Media Matters would shift the focus of its scrutiny from the conservative media to “alt-right” websites, alleged “fake news”, and “misinformation”. He has unmasked, for example, US news outlets that are associated with the Chinese religious movement, Falun Gong.

Carusone has been critical of Elon Musk's 2022 takeover of Twitter. Carusone alleges Musk will allow the social media platform to become a source of hate speech, instead of reasonable controls on information. Carusone has called upon major advertisers to pull funding from Twitter if Musk continues with his supposed planned "radicalization".

Personal life
Carusone is gay and married to Brett Abrams. He lives in Long Island, New York.

References

1982 births
Living people
Media Matters for America people
American political writers